Sasunashen or Karakoymaz may refer to:
Nerkin Sasunashen, Armenia
Verin Sasunashen, Armenia